Syneora hemeropa, the ring-tipped bark moth, is a moth of the family Geometridae first described by Edward Meyrick in 1892. It is found in Tasmania, Australia.

References

Boarmiini